The Syrian Committee to Help Iraq was a political movement created in 1941 to support Iraq against the British during the Anglo–Iraqi War of 1941. It sent weapons and volunteers to fight alongside Iraqi forces against the British. It was organized and led by Arab Ihya Movement (later known as the Arab Ba'ath Movement) leader Michel Aflaq. Zaki al-Arsuzi opposed the organisation.

References

Arab nationalist militant groups
Ba'athist organizations
Organizations established in 1941
Iraq–Syria relations